Rajiv Gandhi Arts and Science College, is a general degree college located in Thavalakuppam, Puducherry. It was established in the year 1995. The college is affiliated with Pondicherry University. This college offers different courses in arts, commerce and science.

Departments

Science
Computer Science
Computer Application

Arts and Commerce
Business Administration
Co-operative Management
Commerce

Accreditation
The college is  recognized by the University Grants Commission (UGC).

References

External links
http://www.rgasc.edu.in/contact.html

Universities and colleges in Puducherry
Educational institutions established in 1995
1995 establishments in Pondicherry
Colleges affiliated to Pondicherry University